Plastic containers are containers made exclusively or partially of plastic. Plastic containers are ubiquitous either as single-use or reuseable/durable plastic cups, plastic bottles, plastic bags, foam food containers, Tupperware, plastic tubes, clamshells, cosmetic containers, up to intermediate bulk containers and various types of containers made of corrugated plastic. The entire packaging industry heavily depends on plastic containers or containers with some plastic content (e.g. plastic coating or when made of composite material), besides paperboard and other materials. Food storage nowadays relies mainly on plastic food storage containers.

A basic but important distinction is between single-use / disposable and multi-use / durable containers. The former makes up a notable portion of the global plastic waste (e.g. toothpaste tubs, food delivery  foam containers, most plastic bottles, etc.).

Because of the multitude of container applications, the types of plastic vary widely. Because of the material variety (combinations are no exception), the waste will make up a significant portion of plainly visible plastic pollution although some containers like bottles are recyclable.

The convenience and low cost of plastics are the main reasons for their continuously increasing use. Plastic packaging can keep food fresh longer, prevent food waste, and provide consumers with a greater variety of food. In addition, goods in plastic packaging can be easily transported and distributed. Plastic has replaced traditional materials like wood, paperboard, and metal for the manufacture of containers because of its price, moldability/formability, durability and light weight.

Waste 
It is estimated that 3.4 billion tonnes of plastic packaging were created between 1950 and 2017. Most plastic packaging is disposed of within a relatively short time. Discarded packaging accounts for 46% (158 million tonnes) of total annual plastic waste generation. Most plastic packaging waste is estimated to come from household waste. According to a 2010 survey by the Waste and Resources Action Programme (WRAP), 73% of all plastic packaging waste in the United Kingdom came from households. Waste plastic packaging makes up a considerable portion of collected aquatic litter (15.9% in the oceans and 74.5% in rivers). 

In a 2019 report, The Coca-Cola Company divulged the company created 3 million tons of plastic packaging in 2017 with Nestlé creating 1.7 million tons, Unilever creating 610,000 tons and Colgate-Palmolive nearly 300,000 tons.

In the late 2010s, 150 companies signed up to be part of The Ellen MacArthur Foundation's commitment to reduce plastic pollution.

Alternatives 
Alternatives such as cotton bags, cardboard boxes and aluminum cans often have larger ecological footprints because these use up more energy and water to manufacture and transport than their plastic equivalents. In addition, very few countries have facilities for recycling materials that are deemed to be less environmentally harmful than plastic. In most cases, this allegedly safe packaging gets in the natural landscape in the form of waste.

Trade groups
In the U.S., the industry is represented by the Society of the Plastics Industry, Closure & Container Manufacturers Association, Flexible Packaging Association, and others.

Global market 
Today packaging is the largest use of plastic resins, accounting for 36% (158 million tonnes) of the world’s total plastic production by mass. Plastic packaging is used in the commercial, retail, household, tourism and agricultural sectors. Consumption rates vary among and within countries, with developing countries generally less reliant on packaging. In China annual plastic packaging consumption is approximately 14 kg/capita; in Europe the rate is much higher, averaging 174 kg/capita.

Asia Pacific dominated the global plastic packaging market in 2016. In second place comes North America. The pharmaceutical and food and beverage industries contributed the most to the use of plastic packaging products. During 2016, Asia Pacific accounted for more than 30 percent of the shares of the total volume consumption in this market.  The Ocean Conservancy reported that China, Indonesia, Philippines, Thailand, and Vietnam dump more plastic in the sea than all other countries combined.

See also
 Fibre-reinforced plastic tanks and vessels
 Health concerns of certain non-biodegradable (fossil fuel-based) plastic food packaging
 Intermediate bulk container
 Flexible intermediate bulk container
 Packaging and labelling
 Packed lunch
 Closure (container)
 Lid (container)
 Plastic milk container
 Plastic crate
 Litter box
 Toolbox
 Disposable lighter
 Blister pack
 Tub (container)
 Euro container
 Systainer

References

Sources

Bibliography
 Soroka, W, "Fundamentals of Packaging Technology", IoPP, 2002, 
 Soroka, W, Illustrated Glossary of Packaging Terminology,  Institute of Packaging Professionals, 
 Yam, K. L., "Encyclopedia of Packaging Technology", John Wiley & Sons, 2009, 

Plastics applications
Containers